Obajana is a town in  Kogi State, Nigeria. It is located in the Oworo district of Lokoja LGA, Kogi state.

Industry 

It is the site of the largest cement plant in Africa owned by Dangote.

Transport 
In 2014, a feasibility study for a railway line to serve this town was commenced.

See also 
 Railway stations in Nigeria
 Cement in Africa

References 

Populated places in Kogi State